The field hockey competition at the 1920 Summer Olympics was held between September 1–5, 1920 in Antwerp, Belgium. Only four teams took part in the tournament and Great Britain won the gold medal.

Results

Standings

Matches

Medalists

The following players represented the French squad, who finished in fourth place:

 Paul Haranger
 Robert Lelong
 Pierre Estrabant
 Georges Breuille
 Jacques Morise
 Edmond Loriol
 Désiré Guard
 Roland Bedel
 André Bounal
 Gaston Rogot
 Pierre Rollin

Notes

References
 
 

 
Field hockey at the Summer Olympics
1920 Summer Olympics events
Summer Olympics
1920 Summer Olympics